Isidor Bajic (16 August 1878 – 15 September 1915) was a Serbian composer, teacher, and publisher.

Biography
He was born in Kula, Austro-Hungarian Empire. A pupil  of Hans von Koessler in Budapest, he taught at the Novi Sad High School, where he founded a music school and initiated the publication of the Serbian Music Magazine and the Serbian Music Library (an occasional edition of Serbian compositions). He was also interested in the melograph. He died in Novi Sad.

His most important work is a romantic national opera Knez Ivo od Semberije (Prince Ivo of Semberia), based on folklore, the subject matter being from the First Serbian Uprising against the Turks at the beginning of the 19th century, in 1804. In addition, he wrote a large number of plays and songs, and light operas as well, a symphony Miloš Obilić (which was lost), an overture Mena, piano pieces (Serbian Rhapsody, An Album of Compositions), songs with piano (the cycle Songs of Love), choral music, and music for tamburica bands. Being romantically sentimental, melodically inventive, frequently almost identical with folk music, these works made him extremely popular within the region of his origin in his day. Bajić is remembered for composing the anthem of the Serbian Sokol Movement -- Pesma Srpskih Sokolova ("Song of the Serbian Sokols").

Also, many poems by Milorad M. Petrović (1875-1921) that were set to music by Isidor Bajić became classics in their own right (Po Gradini mesečina, Zarudela šljiva Ranka, Moj jablane, Sve dok je tvoga blagog oka, and others) more than a century later.

See also
 Kosta Manojlović
 Petar Krstić
 Miloje Milojević
 Stevan Hristić
 Stevan Mokranjac
 Stanislav Binički
 Josif Marinković
 Kornelije Stanković
 Stefan Lastavica
 Nenad Barački

References
Mala enciklopedija Prosveta,I (1978), Prosveta,Beograd
Muzička enciklopedija,I (1977), Jugoslovenski leksikografski zavod, Zagreb
Peričić, V.: Muzički stvaraoci u Srbiji [1969], Prosveta, Beograd

External links
Biography and Other Information

1878 births
1915 deaths
19th-century composers
19th-century male musicians
19th-century musicians
19th-century Serbian people
20th-century composers
20th-century male musicians
20th-century Serbian people
Male composers
People from Kula, Serbia
Serbian composers
Austro-Hungarian musicians
Austro-Hungarian educators